WACK is a Japanese music production company specialising in alternative idols. The company was founded by Junnosuke Watanabe in 2014, following the first disbandment of Bis and the formation of Pla2me.

History

2014–2016: Establishment, formation of Bish, and second generation of Bis
WACK was established by Junnosuke Watanabe on August 3, 2014, after the dissolution of the first generation of Bis and the formation of Pla2me.

On January 14, 2015, the formation of Bish was announced. Bish released their debut studio album, Brand-New Idol Shit, on May 27.

On July 8, 2016, the relaunch of Bis was announced with the return of original member Pour Lui. The second generation of Bis released their debut studio album, Brand-new idol Society 2, on November 16.

2017–2018: Formation of Empire, shuffle units, and Pedro
On August 23, 2017, the formation of Empire, a collaboration group between WACK and Avex, was revealed, their first song "Empire Is Coming" was released on October 6. Empire released their debut studio album, The Empire Strikes Start!!, on April 11.

On October 6, WACK's first shuffle unit, Saint Sex, was formed. They released their first single "WACK is Fxxk" on October 18.

On December 6, WACK and Scrambles released a joint album entitled WACK & Scrambles Works, in which different artists under the company covered different songs such as Bis' "Nerve" and "Gives", Bish's "Orchestra", and Gang Parade's "Plastic 2 Mercy".

On May 28, 2018, WACK launched its trainee unit, Wagg.

On July 26, WACK's second shuffle unit, Holy Shits, released their first single "WACK is Shit".

On September 19, Bish's Ayuni D debuted in the band Pedro with the EP Zoozoosea.

2019: Bis' third generation and formation of two new groups
On March 30, 2019, WACK's founder announced that he would be holding auditions for Bis' third generation. The second generation of Bis disbanded on May 11 with a concert at Akasaka Blitz.

On April 10, WACK's third shuffle unit, Bully Idol, a parody of Billie Idle, released their version of "Soshite, Mata...".

On June 19, a new idol group was announced under the temporary name Curry Rouxz, the group would consist of former Bis members Pan Luna Leafy and Yuina Empire, and Wagg trainee Uruu Ru. Auditions for a fourth member were held and a fourth member Yumeka Naukana? was added to the line-up, which would be named Carry Loose. They released their eponymous debut album on October 22.

The third generation of Bis debuted on August 14, with the album Brand-new idol Society, sharing its name with the first generation of Bis' debut album.

From November to December, WACK documented the audition process of forming a new group through the survival reality show, Monster Idol, which aired on TBS' Wednesday's Downtown. The group's name, Mameshiba no Taigun, debut single "Restart", and final four member line-up was finalised on December 18. Although a fifth member was added on December 25.

2020: Gang Parade split and Carry Loose's disbandment
On March 28, 2020, Gang Parade split into two groups: Go to the Beds and Paradises. They released the debut split EP, G/P, consisting of three songs per group and Kamiya Saki's final solo song before graduating from Gang Parade and WACK on April 1, 2020, after being an artist under the company since August 2014.

On June 1, WACK opened global auditions for a new group.

On October 10, WACK began a livestreamed audition event in which WACK trainees, Wagg, would compete to join Paradises, the livestream was titled .

On October 31, Carry Loose disbanded after an attempt to achieve a major label debut through a 24-hour a day livestream lasting almost three months had failed. Shortly after, Pan Luna Leafy and Uruu Ru left WACK.

Usagi Tsukino, a current member of Paradises at the time was moved to Wagg for six months alongside former Carry Loose member Yuina Empire.

2021: Formation of ASP and temporary addition of AKB48's Yuki Kashiwagi
On February 3, 2021, Bish's Aina the End debuted as a solo artist with the studio album, The End.

On March 27, WACK Audition Camp 2021 ended with Paradises and Go to the Beds gaining a new member each, a new trainee being added to Wagg, and the formation of a new group named ASP. ASP's member were later revealed to be former Carry Loose member Yumeka Nowkana?, Naayu who was a member of WACK's trainee group Wagg, and two new members who had been pre-selected before the audition camp. ASP released their debut album, Anal Sex Penis, on May 26.

On April 9, it was announced that AKB48 member Yuki Kashiwagi would temporarily join all seven current WACK groups as a member, with the stage name Yuki Reysole. On August 31, all seven WACK groups were set to release a single each, all of which would feature Kashiwagi. The release of the singles was later delayed following Kashiwagi's diagnosis of Syringomyelia.

On June 16, a parody of the Sakamichi Series of idol groups and a one-off shuffle unit consisting of every idol that was part of WACK at the time, released the single .

On October 2, Watanabe announced that all members of Go to the Beds and Paradises would immediately swap groups and release a second split EP on December 15.

On October 8, it was announced that a new shuffle unit would be formed of seven WACK members based on votes from fans through a competition named Vote! WACK Select 7, the group are to be produced by Yuki Kashiwagi and the line-up was finalised on December 27.

On November 3, Ayuni D debuted as a solo artist under the name Aomushi (青虫).

On November 30, all seven WACK groups released a single each featuring Yuki Kashiwagi.

The results of Vote! WACK Select 7 which were released on December 27, revealed that the line-up of the new shuffle unit would be Yui Ga Dockson, Tsukino Usagi, Terashima Yuka, Hashiyasume Atsuko, Yamamachi Miki, Yumeno Yua and Cent Chihiro Chittiii. A second shuffle unit formed of three members who ranked low in the competition was also formed of Lingling, Yu-ki Empire and Nameless.

2022: Gang Parade resumes activities, shuffle units, ExWhyZ and Tonai Bousho
On January 2, 2022, Gang Parade, who previously split into Go to the Beds and Paradises, resumed activities with the addition of Kila May, Changbaby and Ca Non as new members.

In an audition camp held from February 24 to 27, WACK's first all-male idol group was formed, they would later be known as WACK Boyz.

On March 23, the Vote! WACK Select 7 winning group was named Spy, while the losing group was named Innocent Ass. Spy's debut single, which features two B-sides: a cover of AKB48's "Ōgoe Diamond" by Spy and Innocents Ass' debut song, "Everyone is Good and Bad", was released on June 1.

On March 26, WACK Audition Camp 2022 concluded with Gang Parade gaining two new members, Ainastar (a former Wagg trainee) and Potential, who joined the group on May 13. ASP also gained two new members, CCCCCC (a former member of HKT48) and Riontown, who made their debut with the group on May 7.

From August 18 to 21, WACK held its second all-male audition camp in order to finalise the line-up of WACK Boyz.

Empire disbanded on June 2. At their final concert Watanabe announced that all of the members of Empire would re-debut as ExWhyZ under EMI Records later that year. ExWhyZ released their debut studio album on November 2.

WACK's trainee unit Wagg disbanded on October 18. All of the members of Wagg left WACK in November.

From December 11 to 14, WACK held audition camp, with the aim of finding new members for Mameshiba no Taigun. All existing members of the group, excluding Kaede who would be graduating on December 17, took part in the camp with their position in the line-up at risk. On December 17, audition camp contestants Momoka and Reona joined the group and Kaede graduated.

On December 15, Tonai Bousho, a girl group formed through Monster Love on Wednesday's Downtown debuted with the single "Cookie".

2023: Boysgroup
WACK Boyz debuted under the name Boysgroup with the album, We Are Boysgroup, in January 2023.

Artists

Groups
Bis
Gang Parade
Bish
Mameshiba no Taigun
ASP
ExWhyZ
Tonai Bousho
Boysgroup

Bands
Pedro

Shuffle units
Saint Sex
Holy Shits
Bully Idol
Dōgenzaka43
Spy
Innocent Ass

Soloists
Aina the End
Aomushi
Cent

Former artists
This is not a business
Sis
Beat Mints Boyz
Carry Loose
Go to the Beds
Paradises
Empire
Wagg

Discography

Studio albums

Concerts and tours
Going Going WACK Tour (2019)
WACK Fuckin' Party (2020)
To Be Continued WACK Tour (2021)
WACK WACK Shit Tour (2022)
Fuck Watanabe Tour (2023)
We will WACK you!! Tour (2023)

References

External links
  

Record labels established in 2014
Japanese record labels
Japanese companies established in 2014